Ilyaz Safi (born 21 January 1999) is a Belarusian professional footballer who plays for Orsha on loan from Naftan Novopolotsk.

References

External links 
 
 

1999 births
Living people
People from Slutsk
Sportspeople from Minsk Region
Belarusian footballers
Association football defenders
FC Minsk players
FC Chist players
FC Arsenal Dzerzhinsk players
FC Smolevichi players
FC Naftan Novopolotsk players
FC Orsha players